The Committee for Medicinal Products for Veterinary Use (CVMP) is the European Medicines Agency's committee responsible for elaborating the agency's opinions on all issues regarding veterinary medicines.

See also 
 Committee for Medicinal Products for Human Use

References

External links 
 Committee for Medicinal Products for Veterinary Use (CVMP)

Health and the European Union
Veterinary organizations
Pharmacy
Animal health
Animal husbandry
Medicated feed